Alvin Lowell "Chigger" Browne (August 3, 1888 – March 2, 1955) was a college football player and track coach.

Sewanee
Browne was a quarterback for the Sewanee Tigers of Sewanee: The University of the South from 1908 to 1910.  Browne also played baseball, basketball, and track. He was twice selected All-Southern, and mentioned by Grantland Rice as one of the great little men of the sport, once weighing only 111 pounds. He was most often listed as some 5 feet 8 inches tall and 125 pounds. Rice also said he was "harder to surround and tackle than a flea." He could run 100 meters in 10 seconds flat. At Sewanee he was a member of Kappa Alpha.

1908
College Football Hall of Fame quarterback Harry Van Surdam, coach of the 1908 team, said of Browne, he "was the greatest quarterback that I have ever seen in my 50 years of being connected with football as a coach and official . . . he was fast as lightning and wasn't afraid of anything. Chigger was so small that we had to keep him taped up to prevent him from getting broken up . . . We had only 18 men on the squad. If we wanted to scrimmage we had to bend the line around."

1909
Browne was quarterback on the SIAA champion 1909 team.

Coaching career

University of Florida
He coached the Florida Gators track team of the University of Florida in 1926 and 1927.

See also
1909 Sewanee Tigers football team
1910 College Football All-Southern Team
Tick Tichenor

References

1888 births
1955 deaths
Sportspeople from Memphis, Tennessee
American football quarterbacks
Sewanee Tigers football players
Players of American football from Memphis, Tennessee
All-Southern college football players
Florida Gators track and field coaches
Florida Gators football coaches